Argentella is a type of needle lace derived from Argentan lace, with a Rosacé ground, a "striking ground of tiny webs."

See also
List of fabric names

References

Needle lace